The Otoyol (Plural: Otoyollar) is the national network of controlled-access highways in Turkey. The network spans  as of 2023 and was first opened in 1973. Another term for the system is Otoban, which is a popular but unofficial term transcribed from the German word autobahn. The term Otoyol translates to motorway while the literal meaning is auto-route.

The Otoyol system previously consisted of three separate networks; the Edirne-Istanbul-Ankara corridor, the Aegean network centered around İzmir, and the Southeastern network centered around Adana. With the completion of the O-5 in 2019 and the extension of the O-21 in 2020, these three networks have since been connected.

History

The construction of a national road system was prioritized in 1948, where the construction of new roads were greatly accelerated. This led to a rise in automobile usage in Turkey. By the 1960s, traffic problems were becoming prevalent in large cities and capacity on intercity roads needed to be upgraded. Plans to build new expressways were put into action in 1968, when construction of the Istanbul Inner Beltway was started. The Beltway, known as the O-1, was opened together with the Bosporus Bridge in 1973 with great fanfare. This became the first motorway to be built in Turkey. The Istanbul Beltway was then to be a part of a large expressway spanning from Edirne, in East Thrace, to İskenderun, on the eastern shore of the Mediterranean Sea. Construction of this expressway first started in 1973 on a  section between Pozantı and Akçatekir, on what would become the O-21. In 1975 construction of a  section of the motorway from Gebze to Izmit was started. Due to financial problems during the following years, construction of the two otoyols were greatly slowed down. It wasn't until 1984 that these two motorways were opened to traffic.

Turgut Özal became Prime Minister in 1983 and brought forth a policy of constructing new otoyols in Turkey. In 1985, construction of an intercontinental motorway spanning  from Edirne to Ankara was started. This motorway project would serve as an outer beltway round Istanbul and also included the construction of a second bridge over the Bosporus, the Fatih Sultan Mehmet Bridge. The motorway was opened in sections in the following years until being completed in 1994.
2 decades later O-7 or Third Beltway opened in 2017.

In 1988 the construction of three new motorways in Izmir were started.
O-32 opened in 1992 and it became first motorway in Agean Region. O-30 was built 1 year after.
And a year after O-31 was opened, running between İzmir and Aydın.
Finally in 2008, O-30 was completed. First section of O-5 was opened between Kemalpaşa and Bornova,
after that in 2019 the motorway opened by phases section between Balıkesir junctions opened in 2018 and Kemalpaşa and Akhisar section was opened in March 2019 and finally in August 2019 remaining sections opened between Akhisar and Balıkesir West, Balıkesir North and Bursa West junctions. In 2020 two new motorways opened to the traffic. One of which is O-33 was opened in February 2020, as a continuous part of O-30. At the same year in November 2020 the first section of O-21 extension was opened and in December 2020 was fully opened all the way to Niğde. Finally in 2021 the 8th phase of O-7 opened, and on 18 March 2022 the newest motorway Otoyol-6 opened between Malkara and Lapseki. Including the 1915 Çanakkale Bridge.

Today two motorway extensions under construction. In O-7 9th phase between Nakkaş-Başakşehir link road and O-31 extension to Denizli. These are planned to open in 2023.

Network map

List of Otoyol routes

Projects

Under Construction

Tender Phase

Planning Phase

Toll

Most motorways are toll roads. The toll is based on the distance traveled. On most sections, the toll can be paid only with RFID-based HGS and OGS. Cash and KGS card payment methods have mostly been abolished in recent years. Only the newly opened Otoyol 5, and Otoyol 7 have sections where it is possible to pay by cash or with credit card. Apart from motorways, the other state roads in Turkey are free of charge.

The revenue from tolls in 2001 were still about $203 million, rising by 2012 to approximately $542 million. In 2012, the Bosphorus bridges saw 150 million vehicles pass and the other toll roads saw over 210 million vehicles. In 2015, both bridges were used by 141 million vehicles while the other toll motorways were used by 271 million vehicles, generating a total revenue of $391 million (both bridges and motorways combined).

Standards

Mainly because the country already has a wide network of double carriageways, the standards for motorways in comparison are very high. Most sections of otoyols have 3 lanes in each direction, aside from the O-4 around Izmit, a small stretch of the O-3 between Silivri and Esenyurt, and the section of O-32 between Alaçatı and Çeşme, which only have two lanes in each direction. Also the O-2, the O-7 and the O-20 all have four lanes in each direction along the entire route. The lanes are each 3.75 meters wide. Most exits have a connection road, which helps avoiding wrong-way driving and illegal access to the road (bikes, tractors and horses are not allowed on otoyols).

Alongside otoyols, there are resting areas, which are standardized as A, B, C and D type service areas. The D type is mainly a parking area. The C type has a fuel station added. The B type has a fuel station and a vehicle service station added. The A type additionally has a motel (in urban ones, this motel is traded for a large shopping mall).

Dangerous stretches such as tunnels or bridges where there is often fog, exits, interchanges and service areas are illuminated.

Since gradients are expected to be very low and turning radii are expected to be very high, otoyols have many bridges and tunnels which makes them very expensive to construct.

Otoyol signs in Turkey are green and uses the Highway Gothic typeface.

Statistics

Length

 Longest otoyol: , O-21 between Ankara and Tarsus.
 Shortest otoyol: , O-1 in Istanbul
 Longest bridge: 1915 Çanakkale Bridge, carries the O-6 over the Dardanelles.
 Longest tunnel: Tunnel 4 between Gebze and İzmit, on the O-7.
 Highest pass: Cankurtaran Pass with 1.580 metres on the O-4 at Ankara-Bolu border.

Provinces

 Provinces with an otoyol route(s): 28 provinces (Adana, Aksaray, Ankara, Aydın, Balıkesir, Bolu, Bursa, Çanakkale, Düzce, Edirne, Gaziantep, Hatay, Istanbul, Izmir, Kahramanmaraş, Kırklareli, Kırşehir, Kocaeli, Konya, Manisa, Mersin, Nevşehir, Niğde, Osmaniye, Sakarya, Şanlıurfa, Tekirdağ, Yalova)
 Provinces without an operational otoyol, but with an otoyol construction undergoing: 1 province (Denizli) 
 Most otoyols in a province: 
5 routes: Istanbul Province, O-1, O-2, O-3, O-4, and O-7.
5 routes: İzmir Province, O-5, O-30, O-31, O-32, and O-33.
 Most provinces served by an otoyol: 
8 provinces served by the O-21: Ankara, Konya, Aksaray, Kırşehir, Nevşehir, Niğde, Adana, Mersin
6 provinces served by the O-4: Istanbul, Kocaeli, Sakarya, Düzce, Bolu, Ankara
6 provinces served by the O-5: Kocaeli, Yalova, Bursa, Balıkesir, Manisa, İzmir
5 provinces served by the O-52: Adana, Osmaniye, Kahramanmaraş, Gaziantep, Şanlıurfa

Gallery

See also
 List of motorway tunnels in Turkey
Turkish State Highway System
List of highways in Turkey
 List of longest highways Turkey, 2nd & 7th
List of controlled-access highway systems
Transport in Turkey
 Roads in Turkey

References

Turkey
Highways
Turkey transport-related lists